Martin Belluš (born 2 December 1991) is a Slovak professional ice hockey player who currently playing for HK Spišská Nová Ves of the Slovak Extraliga.

Career statistics

Regular season and playoffs

Awards and honors

References

External links

 

1991 births
Living people
HK Poprad players
HC '05 Banská Bystrica players
HC Košice players
HC 07 Detva players
ŠHK 37 Piešťany players
HK Spišská Nová Ves players
Indy Fuel players
Yertis Pavlodar players
KH Sanok players
Slovak ice hockey right wingers
Sportspeople from Spišská Nová Ves
HC Slovan Bratislava players
HK Dukla Trenčín players
Slovak expatriate ice hockey players in the Czech Republic
Expatriate ice hockey players in Kazakhstan
Expatriate ice hockey players in Poland
Slovak expatriate sportspeople in Poland
Slovak expatriate ice hockey players in the United States
Slovak expatriate sportspeople in Kazakhstan